Iuliia Shishova (born 30 March 1997) is a Russian Paralympic swimmer. She won bronze in the Women's 50m backstroke S3 in 2020. She has also won five medals in the World Para Swimming European Championships.

References

External links
 
 

Living people
1997 births
Sportspeople from Saratov
Russian female backstroke swimmers
Russian female breaststroke swimmers
Russian female freestyle swimmers
Paralympic swimmers of Russia
Paralympic bronze medalists for the Russian Paralympic Committee athletes
Paralympic medalists in swimming
Swimmers at the 2020 Summer Paralympics
Medalists at the 2020 Summer Paralympics
Medalists at the World Para Swimming European Championships
S3-classified Paralympic swimmers
20th-century Russian women
21st-century Russian women